The Felix A. Jacobs House is a historic house in the Weinland Park neighborhood of Columbus, Ohio, United States. The house was built c. 1905-10 and was listed on the National Register of Historic Places in 1986.

The house is now known as the Huckleberry House, a shelter for youth. Within the house there are multiple different programs all for supporting youth with mental, emotional, and physical problems. It is a safe space for the troubled kids to come and stay (overnight if they want) and receive assistance.

See also
 National Register of Historic Places listings in Columbus, Ohio

References

External links
 

Houses completed in 1905
National Register of Historic Places in Columbus, Ohio
Houses in Columbus, Ohio
Houses on the National Register of Historic Places in Ohio